Günther F. Clauss (born December 31, 1939) is a German professor for Naval Architecture and Ocean Engineering.

Scientific career 

Clauss studied technical physics at the Technical Universities at Munich (B.Sc.) and Berlin (M.Sc -1964.), and completed his doctorate at the Institute of Aerospace (Technical University Berlin) in 1968. Inspired by Professor Alfred Keil, Dean of Engineering at MIT he changed from outer space to inner space, and established the new field 'ocean engineering' at the Technical University Berlin. After his habililtation – a postgraduate degree – he became professor of Ocean Engineering in 1972, and – after research visits at the MIT-Department of Ocean Engineering, the Institute of NAOE, University of California at Berkeley, and the Indian Institute of Technology, Madras – he was offered the first Chair of Ocean Engineering in Germany at the TU Berlin in 1973. For many years he served as a Director of the Institute of Naval Architecture and Ocean Engineering, three legislative periods he was the Dean of the Faculty of Mechanical Engineering and Transport Systems and 12 years Senator at the Academic Council.

Research activities

The extensive research activities of Günther Clauss – focussing on the design and hydromechanics of offshore structures as well as on deep sea technology – cover projects on capsizing of ships, design and optimization of offshore platforms, pipelaying vessels and floating cranes as well as the development of oil skimming vessels, deepsea shuttles and ocean mining systems. For the deterministic analysis of cause-reaction chains he developed a seakeeping test procedure which uses tailored extreme waves – embedded in irregular seas – to investigate precisely wave/structure interactions. With his research assistants, colleagues and industry partners he published more than 400 papers  ('best paper award' OMAE 2006) as well as the books 'Meerestechnische Konstruktionen' (also in Korean) and 'Offshore Structures' (Vol I - Conceptual Design and Hydromechanics, Vol II - Strength and Safety for Structural Design). Under his guidance more than 30 Ph.D. theses have been successfully completed - based on research projects of the European Union, the German Ministries BMBF (Research and Development) and BMWi (Economy and Technology), the German Science Foundation (DFG) and the Association of Industrial Partners (AIF). Günther Clauss served as chairman and member at ITTC and ISSC, is member of STG (executive board), RINA (F) and SNAME (M). In offshore platform decommissioning he served as a member in the IRG of Brent Spar and is currently engaged in the Scientific Review Group (SRG) for the Ekofisk Field (ConocoPhillips) as well as the Brent-Field (Shell).

Awards 
 2005  K.E.R.N.-Maritime Technology Award
 2006  SOBENA  International Reward (for outstanding contributions to the naval architecture and ocean engineering).
 2006/2007 he was awarded by the nomination for the Georg-Weinblum-Memorial Lecturer for outstanding research in the field of hydrodynamics

References

Further reading
 Clauss, G. F.; Lehmann, E., Östergaard, C. : Meerestechnische Konstruktionen. Springer-Verlag, Berlin Heidelberg, New York Paris Tokyo 1988, .
 Clauss, G. F.; Lehmann, E., Östergaard, C. : Offshore Structures Vol. 1 - Conceptual Design. Springer-Verlag, Berlin Heidelberg, New York Paris Tokyo 1992, .
 Clauss, G. F.; Lehmann, E., Östergaard, C. : Offshore Structures Vol. 2 - Strength and Safety for Structural Design. Springer-Verlag, Berlin Heidelberg, New York Paris Tokyo 1994, .
 Clauss, G.: The Taming of the Shrew: Tailoring Freak Wave Sequences for Seakeeping Tests. In: Journal of Ship Research.  Vol. 52, No. 3, 2008
 Clauss, G.: Tsunamis, Monsterwellen und andere Seeungeheuer. In: Festvortrag zur 100. Hauptversammlung der Schiffbautechnischen Gesellschaft e.V..  November 17, 2005, Berlin, Germany
 Bronsart, R., Clauss, G.: mar-ing – The Network of German Universities for a joint NAOE Master Program. In: 25th OMAE - International Conference on Offshore Mechanics and Arctic Engineering June 4–9, 2006, Hamburg, Germany
 Clauss, G.: The Conquest of the Inner Space - Challenges and Innovations in Offshore Technology. In: Marine Systems & Ocean Technology, Journal of SOBENA  Vol. 3, No. 1, June 2007, Rio de Janeiro, Brasil

Technical University of Berlin alumni
Technical University of Munich alumni
Academic staff of the Technical University of Berlin
German naval architects
Living people
1939 births